Vincent Cole Brisby (born January 25, 1971), is a former professional American football wide receiver who played for the New England Patriots and the New York Jets in the National Football League (NFL). He was selected by the New England Patriots in the second round of the 1993 NFL Draft. A 6'3", 193 lb. wide receiver from Northeast Louisiana University (now called University of Louisiana at Monroe), Brisby played eight NFL seasons from 1993 to 2000 for the Patriots and New York Jets. He was given the name Vincent "Ultimate" Brisby by ESPN analyst Chris Berman. Brisby's best game was arguably Week 5 in his second season. He compiled 6 catches for 117 yards and two touchdowns in the Patriots 17-16 comeback win over the Green Bay Packers.

Brisby was a member of the Patriots' 1996 AFC Championship squad. He injured his hamstring in pre-season that year and did not get into a game until Week 12, then missed two more games at which point his coach Bill Parcells was memorably quoted as saying that he himself had "recovered from open-heart surgery faster than he (Brisby) has (from the hamstring injury)...That's the truth. I'm not kidding you." After playing in only three regular season games and catching no passes at all in the regular season, divisional play-off, or AFC Championship, Brisby had two catches against the Green Bay Packers in Super Bowl XXXI.

Personal
Brisby has four children, Donovan,  Chole Brisby, Skyla and Jasmine Nicole

References

1971 births
Living people
American football wide receivers
Louisiana–Monroe Warhawks football players
New England Patriots players
New York Jets players
Players of American football from Houston